Order of Christ  may refer to:
 Order of Christ (Portugal) – former Knights Templar Order awarded initially by the kings of Portugal, now by the Portuguese state
 Order of Christ (Brazil) – a former branch of the Portuguese Order of Christ in the Empire of Brazil, now an order bestowed by the non-regnant Brazilian Imperial Family 
 Order of Christ (Kongo) – a continuation of the Portuguese Order of Christ by the Kingdom of Kongo, now an order bestowed by pretenders to the throne of the Kingdom of Kongo
 Order of Christ (papacy) – the Papal Order

See also
 Order of Christ Cross